F-flat may refer to:

 F-flat major
 F-flat minor, enharmonic to E minor
 The musical pitch F♭